South Branch flows out of East Pond northeast of Big Moose, New York and flows into Stillwater Reservoir southwest of Little Rapids, New York.

References

Rivers of New York (state)
Rivers of Herkimer County, New York